WROV-FM (96.3 MHz) is a commercial FM radio station licensed to Martinsville, Virginia. WROV-FM is owned and operated by iHeartMedia and airs a classic rock radio format.  WROV-FM's signal covers the Roanoke-Lynchburg media market, including the New River Valley and  the Southside of Virginia.

WROV-FM has studios and offices on Brandon Avenue in Roanoke and its transmitter is in Boones Mill, Virginia.

WROV-FMHD2
WROV-FMHD2 carries an African-American-oriented news/talk format under the branding "Roanoke's BIN 96.7".

On November 18, 2020, WROV-FMHD2 and W244AV changed their format from alternative rock to programming from the Black Information Network, branded as "Roanoke's BIN 96.7". The alternative rock format continues on WSTV-HD2 and W245BG.

History of call letters
WROV-FM first signed on the air in January 1950 as WMVA-FM. It was a sister station to WMVA and served Martinsville. In 1989, new ownership purchased WMVA-FM and WROV (now WGMN), and undertook a move of WMVA-FM to Roanoke.

The call letters WROV-FM were previously assigned to a station in Roanoke, Virginia. It began broadcasting on 103.7 MHz in 1948. It was a sister station of WROV and duplicated that station's programming. In 1955, WROV radio's ownership had decided to leave broadcasting altogether after the disastrous effort to start WROV-TV; new management saw the FM station as a money pit and turned in the license in June 1957.

References

External links
96.3 WROV Online

ROV-FM
Radio stations established in 1950
Classic rock radio stations in the United States
IHeartMedia radio stations